California Proposition 90 was a 2006 ballot initiative in the state of California, United States.  Passing of the initiative would have made two changes to California law:
 Eminent domain could not be used by government except to provide facilities for public use, to abate specific public nuisances, and to act in a declared state of emergency.  (This was a reaction to the Supreme Court's decision in Kelo v. City of New London.)
 Government would be required to reimburse property owners whose property value is decreased as a result of any government regulation or action.

The measure was defeated by a vote of 47.6% in favor and 52.4% opposed. In the June 2008 election the more narrowly defined Proposition 99 was passed.

The initiative was similar to the controversial Oregon Ballot Measure 37 (2004).

References

External links 
League of Women Voters of California Education Fund:  In-Depth Nonpartisan Analysis of Proposition 90

2006 California ballot propositions
Eminent domain
Failed amendments to the Constitution of California
Initiatives in the United States